Tivua Island is an island of the Mamanuca Islands, Fiji.

Tivua is a small coral cay located in the northern part of the Mamanuca group of islands.

The island can be walked around in 15 minutes and contains 2 bures (traditional Fijian huts) that are used as accommodation for guests. Captain Cook Cruises operates day cruises to Tivua. 

Tivua is primarily accessed via Port Denerau, with cruising time of approximately 90 minutes from port to the island.  

Tivua Island has a tropical climate with the rainy season December to February.  

The island is currently not inhabited by a local population, but rather serves as a destination for day tourists.

See also

 List of islands

Mamanuca Islands
Islands of Fiji
Ba Province